Saros cycle series 137 for solar eclipses occurs at the Moon's ascending node. It repeats every 18 years, 11 days, and contains 70 events. 55 of these are umbral eclipses and other 15 of these are partial solar eclipses. All eclipses in this series occurs at the Moon's ascending node.

This solar saros is linked to Lunar Saros 130.

Saros 137 

It is a part of Saros cycle 137, repeating every 18 years, 11 days, containing 70 events. The series started with partial solar eclipse on May 25, 1389. It contains total eclipses from August 20, 1533 through December 6, 1695, first set of hybrid eclipses from December 17, 1713 through February 11, 1804, first set of annular eclipses from February 21, 1822 through March 25, 1876, second set of hybrid eclipses from April 6, 1894 through April 28, 1930, and second set of annular eclipses from May 9, 1948 through April 13, 2507. The series ends at member 70 as a partial eclipse on June 28, 2633. The longest duration of totality was 2 minutes, 55 seconds on September 10, 1569. Solar Saros 137 has 55 umbral eclipses from August 20, 1533 through April 13, 2507 (973.62 years).

Summary 
Solar Saros series 137, repeating every 18 years and 11 days, has a total of 70 solar eclipse events including 12 central solar eclipses with a penumbral internal contact, between 1948 and 2146. The penumbra northern limit started in 1948 and will end on 2633, while the penumbra southern limit started in 1389 and will end in 2146.

Umbral eclipses
Umbral eclipses (annular, total and hybrid) can be further classified as either: 1) Central (two limits), 2) Central (one limit) or 3) Non-Central (one limit). The statistical distribution of these classes in Saros series 137 appears in the following table.

List of umbral eclipses

Solar Saros 137 has 55 umbral eclipses between 1533 and 2507. The total duration is almost one millennium, or about within 974 years.

 1533
 1551
 1569
 1587
 1605
 1623
 1641
 1659
 1677
 1695
 1713
 1731
 1750
 1768
 1786
 1804
 1822
 1840
 1858
 1876
 1894
 1912
 1930
 1948
 1966
 1984
 2002
 2020
 2038
 2056
 2074
 2092
 2110
 2128
 2146
 2164
 2182
 2200
 2218
 2236
 2254
 2272
 2290
 2308
 2326
 2345
 2363
 2381
 2399
 2417
 2435
 2453
 2471
 2489
 2507

Events

External links
Saros cycle 137 - Information and visualization

References 
 http://eclipse.gsfc.nasa.gov/SEsaros/SEsaros137.html

Solar saros series